Joseline A. Peña-Melnyk (née Peña, born June 27, 1966) is an American politician who represents District 21 in the Maryland House of Delegates. She unsuccessfully ran for the United States House of Representatives in 2016, coming in third behind Anthony Brown and Glenn Ivey.

Background
Born in the Dominican Republic, Peña was raised in a poverty-stricken family who relied on public assistance and welfare programs. She moved to New York with her mother and sister when she was eight years old. While there, she helped with translation services for her mother and other Spanish-speaking families in Manhattan's Washington Heights neighborhood. Peña moved out after a bad disagreement with her mother, staying with friends and renting a room during her last few months at John F. Kennedy High School. She later attended Buffalo State College, paying her way through school with a series of retail jobs and by volunteering at a shelter for battered women before graduating with a B.S. in criminal justice. She later graduated from the State University of New York at Buffalo, where she earned her Juris Doctor degree. Peña was the first in her family to achieve a college degree.

After law school, Peña started her legal career in the public defender's office in Philadelphia before moving to Washington, D.C., to join her then-fiance Markian Melnyk after failing the bar exam. She later passed the test in 1993 and became a court-appointed defense attorney, advocating for foster children and abused children in the Superior Court of the District of Columbia. Peña-Melnyk later joined the U.S. Attorney’s Office as a prosecutor before leaving the practice after the birth of her first child in 1999. She continued to be active in public life, joining the board of CASA de Maryland and winning a seat on the College Park City Council in 2003.

In the legislature
Peña-Melnyk has been a member of the House Health and Government Operations Committee since she assumed office in 2007. She has served on the Public Health and Long Term Care, Government Operations & Long Term Care, Insurance and Pharmaceuticals, and Public Health and Minority Health Disparities subcommittees. In 2022, she was appointed Chair of the Health and Government Operations Committee, becoming the highest-ranking Latino in the history of the General Assembly.

Peña-Melnyk is also a member of the Legislative Black Caucus of Maryland and the Women Legislators of Maryland. She is also a founding member of the Maryland Legislative Latino Caucus and served as its first Chairperson. In October 2019, Peña-Melnyk, who is Black and Latina, criticized a proposed plan that would require members of both the Legislative Black Caucus and the Legislative Latino Caucus to choose between being a member of either caucus. Following her criticism, the plan was withdrawn for consideration.

In 2019, Peña-Melnyk motioned during a meeting of members of the House of Delegates Democratic Caucus to nominate Adrienne A. Jones as the Speaker of the Maryland House of Delegates, a position to which she was eventually elected in May 2019.

2016 U.S. House of Representatives campaign

On March 14, 2015, Peña-Melnyk announced that she would run for the United States House of Representatives in Maryland's 4th congressional district, seeking to succeed U.S. Representative Donna F. Edwards, who unsuccessfully ran for United States Senate in 2016. Her platform included raising the federal minimum wage and reducing college loan interest rates.

During the primary, she received endorsements from Democracy for America, EMILY's List, Sierra Club, the Congressional Progressive Caucus, and Latino Victory Fund.

Peña-Melnyk was defeated in the Democratic primary by former Lieutenant Governor of Maryland Anthony Brown, receiving 19.0 percent of the vote.

Personal life
Peña-Melnyk is married to her husband, Markian Melnyk. Together, they live in College Park, Maryland, and have three children.

Political positions
Media outlets have described Peña-Melnyk as a progressive.

Abortion
Peña-Melnyk supports codifying the right to abortion into the Maryland Constitution, and criticized a statement from Governor Larry Hogan in 2018 that downplayed needing to do so, calling it "insufficient". Following the U.S. Supreme Court's decision in Dobbs v. Jackson Women's Health Organization, which overturned Roe v. Wade and Planned Parenthood v. Casey,  Peña-Melnyk said that she was gearing up to codify abortion rights in the state constitution.

During the 2022 legislative session, Peña-Melnyk introduced the Healthy Babies Equity Act, a bill that would provide prenatal care to individuals regardless of immigration status. The bill passed and became law without Governor Larry Hogan's signature.

Healthcare
During the 2018 legislative session, Peña-Melnyk introduced a bill to ask the federal government to divert money to Maryland used to offset the cost of high-risk patients on the Affordable Care Act's insurance pool, instead using it under a new "reinsurance program" under the Maryland Health Benefit Exchange. The bill passed and became law with Governor Larry Hogan's signature, and the plan was approved by federal regulators in August 2018.

During the 2019 legislative session, Peña-Melnyk introduced a bill that would require Marylanders without health insurance to pay a state penalty that would go toward purchasing coverage. The bill overwhelmingly passed in the Maryland House of Delegates and unanimously passed the Maryland Senate, and was signed into law by Governor Larry Hogan on May 13, 2019.

During the 2020 legislative session, Peña-Melnyk introduced a bill that would require health care professionals treating patients in perinatal units to receive implicit bias training at least once every two years. The bill passed through both chambers of the Maryland General Assembly unanimously, becoming one of the first implicit bias training laws in the United States.

During the 2021 legislative session, Peña-Melnyk introduced the Shirley Nathan-Pulliam Health Equity Act, a bill that would create the Maryland Commission on Health Equity to examine racial, ethnic, cultural, or socioeconomic disparities in healthcare. She also introduced a bill that would require the Office of Minority Health and Health Disparities to work with the Maryland Health Care Commission to publish a "health disparity policy report card" comparing the state's racial and ethnic identifiers against the state's population by demographic, and another to require licensed health professionals to undergo implicit bias training when they apply to have their licenses renewed. All three bills passed and became law.

During the 2022 legislative session, Peña-Melnyk introduced a bill that would expand Medicaid for immigrants regardless of their legal status, which failed to move out of committee. She also introduced a bill that would provide undocumented pregnant women access to Medicaid, which passed and became law.

Housing
During the 2022 legislative session, Peña-Melnyk introduced a bill to allow tenants to petition courts to shield records in eviction cases where the failure to pay rent was due to an income loss caused by the COVID-19 pandemic. The bill passed and became law on May 29, 2022.

Immigration
During the 2020 legislative session, Peña-Melnyk introduced a bill that would prohibit state law enforcement officers from referring cases to U.S. Immigration and Customs Enforcement.

National politics
During the 2008 Democratic Party presidential primaries, Peña-Melnyk endorsed the candidacy of Barack Obama. In 2012 and in 2020, she served as a delegate to the Democratic National Convention. She was also a member of the electoral college in the 2012 election, casting her vote for Barack Obama in a ceremony at the Maryland State House.

In July 2015, Peña-Melnyk protested Donald Trump at the construction site of the Trump International Hotel in Washington, D.C.

Social issues
During the 2019 legislative session, Peña-Melnyk introduced a bill that would create the Lynching Truth and Reconciliation Commission to facilitate workshops and train commissioners and members of their staff on racial healing. The bill passed and became law.

In 2021, Peña-Melnyk spoke in support of a bill that would make Juneteenth a state and employee-paid holiday in Maryland.

Taxes
During the 2021 legislative session, Peña-Melnyk supported expanding Maryland's Earned Income Tax Credit to provide relief to tax-paying immigrants who were left out of the state's RELIEF Act because they didn't have a Social Security number.

Transportation
In December 2017, Peña-Melnyk said she opposed a proposed Amtrak route for a maglev train between Baltimore and Washington, D.C.

Electoral history

References

1966 births
Living people
American politicians of Dominican Republic descent
Dominican Republic emigrants to the United States
Hispanic and Latino American state legislators in Maryland
Hispanic and Latino American women in politics
Democratic Party members of the Maryland House of Delegates
People from the Bronx
People from College Park, Maryland
Women state legislators in Maryland
African-American state legislators in Maryland
African-American women in politics
2012 United States presidential electors
21st-century American politicians
21st-century American women politicians
21st-century African-American women
21st-century African-American politicians
20th-century African-American people
20th-century African-American women
Maryland city council members
African-American city council members in Maryland
Women city councillors in Maryland
African-American Catholics